The gravity model of migration is a  model in urban geography derived from Newton's law of gravity, and used to predict the degree of migration interaction between two places. Newton's law states that: "Any two bodies attract one another with a force that is proportional to the product of their masses and inversely proportional to the square of the distance between them."

Overview
When used geographically, the words 'bodies' and 'masses' are replaced by 'locations' and 'importance' respectively, where importance can be measured in terms of population numbers, gross domestic product, or other appropriate variables. The gravity model of migration is therefore based upon the idea that as the importance of one or both of the location increases, there will also be an increase in movement between them. The farther apart the two locations are, however, the movement between them will be less. This phenomenon is known as distance decay. 

The gravity model can be used to estimate:
 Traffic flow
 Migration between two areas
 The number of people likely to use one central place

The gravity model can also be used to determine the sphere of influence of each central place by estimating where the breaking point between the two settlements will be. An example of this is the point at which customers find it preferable, because of distance, time and expense considerations, to travel to one center rather than the other.

The gravity model can be used to measure accessibility to services (e.x., access to health care). A special case of gravity model is the two-step floating catchment area method (2SFCA), which is popular in health care research.

The gravity model was expanded by William J. Reilly in 1931 into Reilly's law of retail gravitation to calculate the breaking point between two places where customers will be drawn to one or another of two competing commercial centers.

Opponents of the gravity model explain that it can not be confirmed scientifically, that it's only based on observation. They also state that the gravity model is an unfair method of predicting movement because its biased toward historic ties and toward the largest population centers. Thus, it can be used to perpetuate the status quo.

See also
 Gravity model of trade – uses the same approach for modelling trade flows between two locations, also discusses variants of the initial gravity model
 Radiation law for human mobility
 Heuristic

References

Literature
 
 Rodrigue, J.-P., Comtois, C., Slack, B. (2009). The Geography of Transport Systems. London, New York: Routledge. .

Urban geography